Libre (Free) is the fifth studio album and fourth Spanish language album by Marc Anthony. It was nominated for the 2002 Latin Grammy Award for Best Salsa Album and was nominated for the 2003 Grammy Awards for Best Salsa Album. This album became his third chart-topper in the Billboard Top Latin Albums chart, spending 14 weeks at number-one.

Track listing
 "Celos" ("Jealousy") - 4:47
 "Este Loco Que Te Mira" ("This Crazy Guy Who Watches You") - 4:56
 "Viviendo" ("Living") - 4:44
 "Hasta Que Vuelvas Conmigo" ("Until You Come Back To Me") - 4:51
 "Barco A La Deriva" ("Boat Adrift") - 4.33
 "De Qué Depende" ("What does it Depend On") - 3:51
 "Yo Te Quiero" ("I Want You") - 5:11
 "Amor Aventurero" ("Adventurous Love") - 4:40
 "Caminaré" ("I Will Walk") - 4:17
 "Tragedia" ("Tragedy") (international edition - bonus track) - 3:47

Personnel
 Marc Anthony – vocals 
 Andy Abad – guitar 
David Dominguez – guitar 
 Yomo Toro – cuatro 
 Alberto Martinez – trumpet 
 Ozzie Melendez – trombone 
 Juan A. Gonzalez – piano 
 Erben Perez – bass 
 Marc Quiñones – percussion 
 Bobby Allende – percussion 
 Gian Marco Zignago – writer ("Hasta Que Vuelvas Conmigo")

Charts

Certifications

See also
List of number-one Billboard Top Latin Albums of 2001
List of number-one Billboard Top Latin Albums of 2002
List of number-one Billboard Tropical Albums from the 2000s

References

2001 albums
Marc Anthony albums
Spanish-language albums
Sony Discos albums
Columbia Records albums